Amik is the mascot of the 1976 Summer Olympics.

It is also a given name. 

Amik may refer to:

Places
Lake Amik, a lake in Turkey
Amik Valley, Hatay Province, Turkey. In Islamic eschatology, one of two possible sites, the other being Dabiq, North Syria, where the battle of Armageddon will take place.

People with the given name
Amik Kasoruho (1932-2014), Albanian author, translator, publicist
Amik Robertson (born 1998), American football cornerback
Amik Sherchan (born 1944), Nepali politician, deputy Prime Minister, government minister, firmer chairman of Janamorcha Nepal

Others
Lokot-lokot, or locot-locot, Philippines delicacy, also known in Davao del Sur as amik